Vaccination and religion have interrelations of varying kinds. No major religion prohibits vaccinations, and some consider it an obligation because of the potential to save lives. However, some people cite religious adherence  as  a basis for opting to forego vaccinating themselves or their children. Many such objections are pretextual: in Australia, anti-vaccinationists founded the Church of Conscious Living, a "fake church", leading to religious exemptions being removed in that country, and one US pastor was reported to offer vaccine exemptions in exchange for online membership of his church.

Historical 
The influential Massachusetts preacher Cotton Mather was the first known person to attempt smallpox inoculation on a large scale, inoculating himself and more than two hundred members of his congregation with the help of a local doctor. While his view later became standard, there was a strong negative reaction against him at the time.

Rowland Hill (1744–1833) was a popular English preacher acquainted with Edward Jenner, the pioneer of smallpox vaccination, and he encouraged the vaccination of the congregations he visited or preached to. He published a tract on the subject in 1806, at a time when many medical men refused to sanction it. Later he became a member of the Royal Jennererian Society, which was established when vaccination was accepted in Britain, India, the US, and elsewhere. John C. Lettsom, an eminent Quaker physician of the day wrote to Rowland Hill commenting:

Several Boston clergymen and devout physicians formed a society that opposed vaccination in 1798. Others complained that the practice was dangerous, going so far as to demand that doctors who carried out these procedures be tried for attempted murder.

In 1816 Iceland made the clergy responsible for smallpox vaccination and gave them the responsibility of keeping vaccination records for their parishes; Sweden also had similar practices.

When vaccination was introduced into UK public policy, and adoption followed overseas, there was opposition from trade unionists and others, including sectarian ministers and those interested in self-help and alternative medicines like homeopathy.

Anti-vaccinationists were most common in Protestant countries. Those who were religious often came from minority religious movements outside of mainstream Protestantism, including Quakers in England and Baptists in Sweden.

Catholic and Anglican missionaries vaccinated Northwest Coast Native Americans during an 1862 smallpox epidemic.

In the UK, a number of Vaccination Acts were introduced to control vaccination and inoculation, starting in 1840, when smallpox inoculation was banned. The 1853 Act introduced compulsory free infant vaccination enforced by local authorities. By 1871, infant vaccination was compulsory and parents refusing to have their child vaccinated were fined and imprisoned if the fines were not paid. Resistance to compulsion grew, and in 1889, after riots in Leicester, a Royal Commission was appointed and issued six reports between 1892 and 1896. It recommended the abolition of cumulative penalties. This was done in an 1898 Act, which also introduced a conscience clause that exempted parents who did not believe vaccination was efficacious or safe. This extended the concept of the "conscientious objector" in English law. A further Act in 1907 made it easier to obtain exemption.

Jehovah's Witnesses condemned the practice of vaccination in 1931 as "a direct violation of the everlasting covenant that God made with Noah after the flood", but reversed that policy in 1952. The decision of whether to vaccinate themselves or their family is left to individuals. Some more recent Jehovah's Witness publications have mentioned the success of vaccination programs.

Current 

Some conservative Christian groups in the United States oppose mandatory vaccination for diseases typically spread via sexual contact, arguing that the possibility of disease deters risky sexual contact . For example, the Family Research Council opposes mandatory vaccination against HPV, a virus that causes  various cancers: "Our primary concern is with the message that would be delivered to nine- to twelve-year-olds with the administration of the vaccines. Care must be taken not to communicate that such an intervention makes all sex 'safe'." Studies have shown that HPV vaccination does not result in increased sexual activity. Other Christians have supported vaccinations and mask wearing in the wake of COVID-19 to stop the spread of the disease, even using scripture to support the position.

Islam and Judaism, religions with dietary prohibitions that regard particular animals as unclean, make exceptions for medical treatments derived from those animals. However, this may not be universally accepted due to a lack of central authority in these religions. For example, in Aceh Province, an autonomous province of Indonesia with its own Islamic Sharia Law, eighty percent of people refuse all vaccinations due to concerns about pig, or its derivatives, being used to make some vaccines (eating pig is considered haram).

The Church of Jesus Christ of Latter-day Saints has made vaccination an official initiative in its humanitarian relief program. The Church has also called on its members to see that their own children are properly vaccinated. In March 2021, the Church added encouragement to vaccinate to its General Handbook of Instructions, noting that "Vaccinations administered by competent medical professionals protect health and preserve life.... Members of the Church are encouraged to safeguard themselves, their children, and their communities through vaccination." In August 2021, the Church again encouraged vaccination, specifically against COVID-19, in a public statement from the First Presidency: "We know that protection from [Covid and its variants] can only be achieved by immunizing a very high percentage of the population.... To provide personal protection from such severe infections, we urge individuals to be vaccinated."

Although the Church of Christ, Scientist encourages reliance on prayer, it does not forbid vaccination or any other medical practice,  and in recent years it did not renew its application for religious exemption for vaccinations in Australia because it deemed the exemption "no longer current or necessary".

The Congregation of Universal Wisdom, a religion based on belief in chiropractic spinal adjustments and Universal Intelligence, forbids vaccinations. The New York Times covered the Congregation of Universal Wisdom and noted that many families have used these religious memberships to avoid vaccination requirements. In a court case citing the Congregation of Universal Wisdom, Turner v. Liverpool Cent. School, the United States District Court in New York affirmed the permissibility of claiming religious exemption from vaccination on the basis of such membership.

The use of fetal tissue in the development of vaccines has also provoked some controversy among religions opposed to abortion. The cell culture media of some viral vaccines, and the virus of the rubella vaccine, are derived from tissues taken from aborted fetuses, leading to moral questions. For example, the principle of double effect, originated by Thomas Aquinas, holds that actions with both good and bad consequences are morally acceptable in specific circumstances, and the question is how this principle applies to vaccination. The Vatican Curia has expressed concern about the rubella vaccine's embryonic cell origin, saying Catholics have "...a grave responsibility to use alternative vaccines and to make a conscientious objection with regard to those which have moral problems". The Vatican concluded that until an alternative becomes available it is acceptable for Catholics to use the existing vaccine, writing, "This is an unjust alternative choice, which must be eliminated as soon as possible."

Political opposition to vaccination by religious groups 
The majority of Orthodox Rabbis view vaccination as a religious obligation. A magazine called P.E.A.C.H. that presented an anti-immunization message to Orthodox Jews was distributed in Brooklyn, New York in early 2014. This is not a widespread phenomenon though. 96% of students at Yeshivas (who are essentially all Orthodox Jewish) in New York City were immunized according to information obtained in 2014, although this is a lower than average rate.

In 2003 imams in northern Nigeria advised their followers not to have their children vaccinated with oral polio vaccine, perceived to be a plot by Westerners to decrease Muslim fertility. The boycott caused the number of polio cases to rise not only in Nigeria but also in neighboring countries. The followers were also wary of other vaccinations, and Nigeria reported more than twenty thousand measles cases and nearly six hundred deaths from measles from January through March 2005. In 2006 Nigeria accounted for more than half of all new polio cases worldwide. Outbreaks continued thereafter; for example, at least 200 children died in a late-2007 measles outbreak in Borno State. In 2013, nine health workers administering polio vaccine were targeted and killed by gunmen on motorcycles in Kano, but this was an isolated incident. Local traditional and religious leaders and polio survivors worked to support the vaccination campaign, and Nigeria has not had a polio case since July 24, 2014; in 2016, Nigeria was declared polio-free.

In the 2000s, in Pakistan and Afghanistan, some Taliban issued fatwas opposing vaccination as an American plot to sterilize Muslims, and kidnapped, beat, and assassinated vaccination officials; the head of Pakistan's vaccination campaign in Bajaur Agency was assassinated in 2007, on his way back from a meeting with a religious leader. In 2011, a CIA spy ran a fake hepatitis vaccination campaign to search for Osama bin Laden; such actions were strongly condemned by US and international health NGOs, the doctor involved was jailed and the CIA promised not to use vaccination as a cover again. A genuine polio vaccinator had previously vaccinated Osama bin Laden's children and grandchildren in his compound in Abbottabad. Both major sides of the Afghan civil war now support polio vaccination, and polio rates are declining rapidly in Afghanistan, with only five cases in January–July 2015. In Pakistan there were 28 cases in the same period.

In 2015, leaders of the Nation of Islam spoke out against a California Bill that removed philosophical exemptions to school vaccination requirements, alleging a link between MMR vaccine and autism. They also said that government mandated vaccines were another Tuskegee Syphilis Study.

According to a March 2021 poll conducted by The Associated Press/NORC, vaccine skepticism is more widespread among white evangelicals than most other blocs of Americans. 40% of white evangelical Protestants stated they weren't likely to get vaccinated against COVID-19.

Exemptions 
In the U.S., all states except Mississippi, California, West Virginia, Maine and New York allow parents to exempt their children from otherwise-required vaccinations for religious reasons. The number of religious exemptions rose greatly in the late 1990s and early 2000s; for example, in Massachusetts, the rate of those seeking exemptions rose from 0.24% in 1996 to 0.60% in 2006. Some parents falsely claim religious beliefs to get exemptions. The American Medical Association opposes such exemptions, saying that they endanger health not only for the unvaccinated individual but also for neighbors and the community at large.

On January 1, 2016, Australia introduced legislation that removed eligibility for childcare and welfare benefits if parents refuse to vaccinate their children, removing religious exemptions at the same time as the only religion to apply for an exemption (Church of Christ, Scientist) deemed their exemption to no longer be relevant.

References 

Religion and medicine
Religion, Vaccination and
Religion, Vaccination and